The Mission Inn, now known as The Mission Inn Hotel & Spa, is a historic landmark hotel in downtown Riverside, California. Although a composite of many architectural styles, it is generally considered the largest Mission Revival Style building in the United States. Mission Inn Hotel & Spa is a member of Historic Hotels of America, the official program of the National Trust for Historic Preservation.

The owners are Duane and Kelly Roberts. The latter serves as vice chairman and chief operating officer.

History
The property began as a quaint adobe boarding house called The Glenwood Cottage, built by engineer/surveyor Christopher Columbus Miller and on November 22, 1876, the Millers took their first paying guest. In February 1880, Miller's son Frank Augustus Miller purchased the hotel and land from his father. It became into a full-service hotel in the early 1900s due to California's economic citrus boom and warm weather, attracting wealthy travelers and investors from East Coast and Europe. In 1902, Frank changed the name to the "Glenwood Mission Inn" and started building, in a variety of styles, until he died in 1935.

Miller's vision for the eclectic structure was drawn from many historical design periods, revivals, influences, and styles. Some are Spanish Gothic architecture, Mission Revival Style architecture, Moorish Revival architecture, Spanish Colonial style architecture, Spanish Colonial Revival Style architecture, Renaissance Revival architecture, and Mediterranean Revival Style architecture. With one section over another, addition upon addition, the result is a complicated and intricately built structure. It contains narrow passageways, exterior arcades, a medieval-style clock, a five-story rotunda, numerous patios and windows, castle towers, minarets, a Cloister Wing (with catacombs), flying buttresses, Mediterranean domes and a pedestrian sky bridge among many other features.

During the 30-year construction period, Miller traveled the world, collecting treasures to bring back to the hotel for display.

The St. Francis Chapel houses four large, stained-glass windows and two original mosaics by Louis Comfort Tiffany in 1906. The windows were salvaged from the Madison Square Presbyterian Church and the chapel purpose built to house them. The Mexican-Baroque styled "Rayas Altar" is 25 feet tall by 16 feet across, carved from cedar and completely covered in gold leaf. For his "Garden of Bells," Miller collected over 800 bells, including one dating from the year 1247 described as the "oldest bell in Christendom."

In 1932, Frank Miller opened the St. Francis Atrio. The "Famous Fliers' Wall", added by Miller's son-in-law DeWitt Hutchings, was used to recognize notable aviators, including Amelia Earhart. On March 20, 1942, World War I ace Eddie Rickenbacker was honored at the inn, becoming the fifty-seventh flier added to the monument. Today, 151 fliers or groups of fliers are honored by having their signatures etched onto  copper wings attached to the wall.

Frank Miller died in 1935 and the inn continued under the management of his daughter and son-in-law, Allis and DeWitt Hutchings, who died in 1956. The inn then went through a series of ownership changes and some of its older rooms were converted to apartments and used as dorms for UC Riverside. In the early 1960s, St. John's College considered buying it as a location for its western campus but abandoned negotiations when John Gaw Meem donated land in Santa Fe, New Mexico.

In 1992, Owner Duane Roberts rescued The Mission Inn Hotel & Spa from the brink of demolition, resurrecting the property’s iconic Spanish Mission-style opulence while modernizing the hotel with comfort, technology, culinary, shopping, wedding, and spa amenities. His wife, Owner, Vice Chairman and Chief Operating Officer Kelly Roberts, oversees the AAA Four Diamond-rated Mission Inn and maintains its lofty hospitality standards. The couple brings to life annual events such as the Festival of Lights, Feste dell’Amore, the Pumpkin Stroll, as well as immersive additions like Conde Nast Kelly’s Spa and Boutique and dynamic culinary venues.

Architecture

With its widely varying styles, the Mission Inn was designed by multiple architects. Frank Miller selected Arthur Burnett Benton to design the original building. Miller chose Myron Hunt to design the Spanish Wing added to the rear of the main building. He later hired G. Stanley Wilson to design the St. Francis Chapel. Wilson also added a rotunda featuring circular staircases and a dome.

Notable guests
For 120 years, the Mission Inn has been the center of Riverside, host to U.S. Presidents, celebrities, a number of seasonal and holiday functions, as well as occasional political functions and other major social gatherings. Pat and Richard Nixon were married in what is now the Presidential Lounge, Nancy and Ronald Reagan honeymooned there, and eight other U.S. presidents have visited the inn: Benjamin Harrison, William McKinley, Theodore Roosevelt, William Howard Taft, Herbert Hoover, John Fitzgerald Kennedy, Gerald Ford, and George W. Bush.

Social leaders who have stopped at the Mission Inn include Susan B. Anthony, Henry Ford, Andrew Carnegie, John D. Rockefeller, Henry Huntington, Albert Einstein, Joseph Pulitzer, William Randolph Hearst, Hubert H. Bancroft, Harry Chandler, Booker T. Washington, Helen Keller and John Muir.

The list of entertainers who have toured the inn is extensive. Lillian Russell, Sarah Bernhardt and Harry Houdini were early visitors to Frank Miller's hotel. Other guests have included actors such as Ethel Barrymore, Charles Boyer, Eddie Cantor, Mary Pickford, Ginger Rogers, Bette Davis (who was married at the inn in 1945), W.C. Fields, Clark Gable, Cary Grant, Spencer Tracy, Fess Parker, James Brolin and Barbra Streisand, Raquel Welch and Drew Barrymore. Other celebrities such as Jack Benny, Bob Hope, Glen Campbell, Merle Haggard and Tears for Fears have stopped by. Noted Jazz bassist, Henry Franklin, played a regular five-night gig for over a decade at The Mission Inn until 2011.

The inn continues to be a getaway for notable individuals to this day. Arnold Schwarzenegger has stayed there during his tenure as governor of California and the Osbournes have paid a visit in the past few years.

During the inn's "Festival of Lights" celebration in November 2022, a fire broke out on the roof following the fireworks display.

Today

The hotel, which occupies an entire city block, has four restaurants, a day spa, and 239 guest rooms (nine rooms designated as presidential suites). It is a National Historic Landmark, a California Historical Landmark, and Riverside City Landmark #1. The hotel's aesthetic charm makes it a frequent subject for local artists.

Dining
The hotel features four restaurants, two lounges, and a tequila bar.

Popular culture

In 1909 Carrie Jacobs-Bond wrote the lyrics for her famous song "A Perfect Day" while staying in the Mission Inn. For many years the Mission Inn's carillon played "A Perfect Day" as the last tune each evening. In 2016, the Mission Inn announced the return of daily performances of "A Perfect Day" as part of its commitment to preserve the history of the hotel.

American author Anne Rice so enjoyed the inn she incorporated it into her 2009 book Angel Time. The book is the first in Rice's Songs of the Seraphim series, which tells the story of Toby O'Dare, an assassin with a tragic past, who uses the Mission Inn as his refuge. Similarly, American author John Van Vlear featured the inn in his 2012 novel Treachery at Torrey Pines: A Shank MacDuff Mystery. Van Vlear relays a memorable lunch at the inn during which the golf-caddy hero picks the brain of his retired father who used to work in the banking industry as a security analyst.

The inn's unique architecture and ambiance have attracted many film makers. Film shoots at the inn include 1938's Idiot's Delight with Clark Gable, 1951's The First Legion with Charles Boyer, 1969's Tell Them Willie Boy Is Here with Robert Redford, 1975's The Wild Party with Raquel Welch and James Coco, Billy Wilder's 1981 comedy Buddy Buddy with Jack Lemmon and Walter Matthau, 1988's Vibes with Jeff Goldblum, 1977's Black Samurai with Jim Kelly, and 1998's The Man in the Iron Mask with Leonardo DiCaprio.

The Mission Inn was featured in a Traveltalks short subject by James A. Fitzpatrick in the 1944 episode "Along the Cactus Trail".

In 1982, Eddie Money filmed the music video of "Think I'm in Love" at the inn.

The Sliders season 3 episodes 16 and 17 ("Exodus", parts I and II) were shot extensively in the Mission Inn, which played as a military base.

The finale of the 1973-74 TV series The Magician season 1 episode "Man on Fire" was shot extensively in the Mission Inn, which was supposedly "under renovation".Tears for Fears also filmed the video for the album Raoul and the Kings of Spain with the same name in the late 90's at the end. Roland Orzabal also had pictures for the album taken there as well.

Mission Inn Museum
The Mission Inn Museum promotes the cultural heritage of the Mission Inn. It is operated by the Mission Inn Foundation, an independent nonprofit organization. A permanent exhibition features the history of the inn as well as inland Southern California history. The main gallery hosts changing exhibitions which rotate 2-3 times per year. The museum offers educational programs and daily guided tours. Specialty tours on the Women of the Mission Inn, the hotel's fine art collection, photography tours, and architecture tours are offered on a quarterly basis. The Hands On History Outreach Program is an educational workshop series that provides opportunities for middle school students to connect with their local heritage through oral history interviews, photography, technology, and public speaking. Youth Ambassadors is a high school docent program which encourages civic engagement, leadership, and confidence in youth ages 15–18. The daily guided tours are the museum's most popular attraction, hosting over 20,000 guests per year.

See also

 Mount Rubidoux – a city park in Riverside developed from land donated by the Miller family

References

Footnotes

Bibliography
 Gale, Zona. Frank Miller of the Mission Inn. D. Appleton-Century Co., New York. 1938. 
 Hall, Joan H. Through the Doors of the Mission Inn. Highgrove Press, Riverside, California. 1996. . 
 Hall, Joan H. Through the Doors of the Mission Inn; Volume Two. Highgrove Press, Riverside, California. 2000. . 
 Hodgen, Maurice. Master of the Mission Inn: Frank Miller, a Life. North Charleston, SC, Ashburton Publishing, c2013.  
 Hutchings, DeWitt . Handbook of the Mission Inn, Riverside, California. Frank A. Miller. 1951. 
 Also see: Hutchings, DeWitt V. and Borton, Francis. Handbook of the Glenwood Mission Inn. 1929. 
 Klotz, Esther. The Mission Inn: Its History and Artifacts. Rubidoux Printing, Riverside, California. 1981. 
 Moore, Barbara (editor). Historic Mission Inn. Friends of the Mission Inn, Riverside, California. 1998. . 
 Parks, Walter P. The Famous Fliers' Wall of the Mission Inn. Infinity Press, Orange, California. 2004. Library of Congress Number 86-90693. 
 Mission Inn. The Bells and Crosses of the Mission Inn, Riverside, California. (between 1927 and 1938). 
 An earlier version is available as Bells and crosses of the Mission Inn and the Ford Paintings of the California Missions [1908?].  (available as a digitized version, and which includes a reference to the paintings of the California Missions done by Henry Chapman Ford)

External links

 Mission Inn home page
 Mission Inn Museum home page
 Historic Hotels description page
 National Historic Landmark description page
 

Hotels in California
Buildings and structures in Riverside, California
Mission Revival architecture in California
Mediterranean Revival architecture in California
Spanish Revival architecture in California
Spanish Colonial Revival architecture in California
California Historical Landmarks
History museums in California
History of Riverside, California
Landmarks in Riverside, California
Museums in Riverside, California
National Historic Landmarks in California
Tourist attractions in Riverside, California
Myron Hunt buildings
Hotels established in 1876
Hotel buildings completed in 1876
Hotel buildings completed in 1935
Hotel buildings on the National Register of Historic Places in California
National Register of Historic Places in Riverside County, California
1876 establishments in California
Historic Hotels of America